The Australia cricket team toured New Zealand in February and March 2021 to play five Twenty20 International (T20I) matches. In August 2020, New Zealand Cricket confirmed that the tour was going ahead, and were working with their government to comply with biosecurity during the COVID-19 pandemic. On 29 September 2020, New Zealand Cricket confirmed the schedule against Australia. Originally, the tour was scheduled to be a three match series, but was increased to five matches. The last three T20I matches took place on the same day as the New Zealand women's fixtures at the same venues.

On 27 February 2021, the third T20I match was moved from Eden Park in Auckland to the Wellington Regional Stadium after Auckland went into lockdown due to the COVID-19 pandemic. The remaining matches were scheduled to be played behind closed doors. However, crowds were allowed to attend the last T20I after restrictions were relaxed.

On 1 March 2021, the final T20I was also moved from the Bay Oval in Tauranga to the Wellington Regional Stadium, after logistical complications arose from the movement of the fourth T20I. New Zealand won the first two T20Is, with Australia winning the next two matches to level the series. New Zealand won the fifth and final T20I by seven wickets, winning the series 3–2.

Squads

Despite being injured, Martin Guptill was included in New Zealand's squad, with Finn Allen named as his standby. Ahead of the third T20I, Adam Milne was added to New Zealand's squad as cover, after Mitchell Santner was ruled out due to illness.

T20I series

1st T20I

2nd T20I

3rd T20I

4th T20I

5th T20I

References

External links
 Series home at ESPN Cricinfo

2021 in Australian cricket
2021 in New Zealand cricket
International cricket competitions in 2020–21
2020-21